Lika is a feminine given name and a surname. It may refer to:

Given name
 Lika Kavzharadze (1959–2017), Georgian film actress
 Lika Mutal (1939–2016), Dutch sculptor
 Lika Ordzhonikidze (born c. 1990), Georgian beauty pageant contestant
 Lika Roman (born 1985), Ukrainian beauty pageant contestant
 Lika Salmanyan (born 1997), Armenian actress

Surname
 Bujar Lika (born 1992), Albanian footballer
 Gilman Lika (born 1987), Albanian footballer
 Granuel Lika (born 1998), Albanian footballer
 Gresild Lika (born 1997), Albanian footballer
 Hasan Lika (born 1960), Albanian football coach and former player
 Ilion Lika (born 1980), Albanian footballer
 Ismail Lika, Kosovar-Albanian mobster active in New York City in the 1980s
 Peter Lika (born 1947), German operatic bass
 Savva Lika (born 1970), Greek retired javelin thrower

Feminine given names